National Route 191 is a national highway in Japan connecting Shimonoseki, Yamaguchi and Naka-ku, Hiroshima in Japan, with a total length of 284.1 km (176.53 mi).

References

National highways in Japan
Roads in Hiroshima Prefecture
Roads in Shimane Prefecture
Roads in Yamaguchi Prefecture